Herpetogramma magna is a moth in the family Crambidae. It was described by Arthur Gardiner Butler in 1879. It is found in Japan, Russia and Taiwan.

References

Moths described in 1879
Herpetogramma
Moths of Asia